Richard Penn Jr. (1735 – 27 May 1811, Richmond, Surrey, England) served as the lieutenant governor of the Province of Pennsylvania from 1771 to 1773, and was later a member of the British Parliament.

Life
Penn, of Laleham in Middlesex, was the second son of Richard Penn Sr. (1706–1771) and his wife Hannah Lardner, daughter of Richard Lardner M.D.; and the grandson of William Penn, the founder of Pennsylvania. He was educated at Eton College and St John's College, Cambridge before joining the Inner Temple. In 1763 he and his brother John visited Pennsylvania, of which his family were still sole proprietors. He was qualified as a councilor on 12 January 1764.  During 1768 he was elected as a member of the American Philosophical Society. In 1771 he returned to Pennsylvania and was appointed lieutenant governor. He soon became acting governor when his brother returned to England to attend to the colony's legal interests. He proved popular with the provincials, taking much care over their commercial interests, but less so with his uncle, the proprietor. After two years he was supplanted by the re-appointment of his brother as governor.
 

On 21 May 1772, at Christ Church, Philadelphia, he married Mary "Polly" Masters, daughter of the late William Masters of Philadelphia. The bride's mother gave them a splendid city house as a wedding present. Penn entertained members of the Continental Congress at his Philadelphia city house, a Virginia delegate, Colonel George Washington, being among his guests.

Richard Penn was elected a trustee of the College and Academy of Philadelphia (now the University of Pennsylvania) in 1772, serving as president of the board in 1773 and 1774. With the coming of the Revolution, he retired and returned to England in the summer of 1775, when the Continental Congress entrusted him with the Olive Branch Petition to the King. George III refused to accept the petition, but Penn gave evidence to the House of Lords on the colonies' attitudes toward independence.

After the conclusion of the American Revolution, he was allowed compensation by the US government for the loss of his proprietary rights in Pennsylvania, and visited Philadelphia again in 1808. James Boswell (who was a friend of Penn's) records that in 1789 the influential Earl of Lonsdale urged the government to appoint Penn as Britain's first Ambassador to the United States, although nothing came of the idea.

Penn entered Parliament in 1784 as member for Appleby, elected on the Lonsdale interest, and subsequently also represented two other Lonsdale-dominated boroughs, Haslemere and Lancaster. He was a reliable supporter of Pitt's government (breaking with the other Lonsdale-backed members to support Pitt over the Regency crisis in 1788–89), but rarely if ever spoke in the House of Commons. He resigned his seat in 1791, but returned to Parliament at the next general election, in 1796.

Richard and Mary Penn had two sons, William Penn (1776–1845) and Richard Penn, FRS (1784–1863), and two daughters, Hannah, who died without issue and Mary who married Samuel Paynter (she also died without issue). He died at Richmond-on-Thames in 1811.

President's House
Penn sold his Philadelphia city house to Robert Morris in 1785. From 1790 to 1800, while Philadelphia was the temporary capital of the United States, it served as the executive mansion for Presidents George Washington and John Adams until the national capital moved to Washington, DC in November 1800.

Notes

References
 Dictionary of National Biography
 The Penn Family
 Lewis Namier & John Brooke, The History of Parliament: The House of Commons 1754-1790 (London: HMSO, 1964)
Robert Beatson, A Chronological Register of Both Houses of Parliament (London: Longman, Hurst, Res & Orme, 1807)

External links
Biography and portrait at the University of Pennsylvania

1730s births
1811 deaths
Members of the Parliament of the United Kingdom for English constituencies
Members of the Parliament of Great Britain for English constituencies
Whig (British political party) MPs
Cumbria MPs
English people of Welsh descent
Colonial governors of Pennsylvania
People of Pennsylvania in the American Revolution
UK MPs 1801–1802
UK MPs 1802–1806
University of Pennsylvania
Alumni of St John's College, Cambridge
Richard
British MPs 1784–1790
British MPs 1790–1796
British MPs 1796–1800
Members of the Parliament of Great Britain for Appleby
People educated at Eton College